Gordon "Gordie" Hogg  (born August 24, 1946) is a Canadian politician who served as the Member of Parliament for South Surrey—White Rock in the House of Commons of Canada from December 11, 2017 until October 21, 2019, as a member of the Liberal Party of Canada. He previously served in the Legislative Assembly of British Columbia as the MLA for Surrey-White Rock from 1997 until 2017, as a member of the British Columbia Liberal Party.

Early life

Hogg was born to Kathleen and Dr. Allan Hogg, a prominent physician in White Rock, who was instrumental in establishing the first White Rock Hospital in 1954, and is the oldest of four children. Dr. Hogg went on to deliver more than 1,100 children during his time in the community, with a wing of the Peace Arch Hospital named in his honour.

He received his Bachelor of Arts in sociology and psychology from the University of British Columbia and his master's degree in psychology from Antioch College. At the age of 70, while working as a Member of Legislative Assembly, he completed an interdisciplinary doctorate that focused on public policy from Simon Fraser University.

Hogg and his wife LaVerne have one son, Blair, as well were foster parents and billet parents for the Surrey Eagles hockey team.
During his time at the University of British Columbia, Hogg was a two-sport athlete, playing football and basketball, including winning the National Junior Men’s Basketball Championship in 1967.

Hogg began coaching baseball in the community in his teens. He was asked to go before White Rock City Council to request support for the team to go to Edmonton for the championships. Upon returning home, Hogg said that he thought the whole thing had been pointless, to which his mother replied “Son, I hoped I’d always raised you to be the kind of person that if you didn’t like something, you wouldn’t complain about it, but you’d get involved and try and make a difference.” Hogg has said that this is what lead him to run for politics, first at the municipal level, then provincially, and federally.

Political career

Municipal 
Hogg served on White Rock city council for 20 years, for 10 of which he was mayor. He has been a board member of more than 15 committees and non-profit societies, including the Peace Arch Community Health Council and Peace Arch Hospital. Hogg was elected in 1974 as City Councilor for the City of White Rock. He was elected mayor in 1984. During his tenure as mayor, Hogg oversaw the development of the White Rock Promenade along the water front, as well as the repurposing of the old Train Station, into the White Rock Museum and Archives.

He first ran for federal office under the Liberal banner in the riding of Surrey—White Rock—South Langley in 1993, placing second behind Reform candidate Val Meredith.

Provincial 

He was first elected to the British Columbia Legislative Assembly in a 1997 by-election, and held the seat for twenty years. When the BC Liberals formed Government, Hogg was appointed Minister of Children and Family Development under Premier Gordon Campbell. Hogg would go on to hold a variety of portfolios for Campbell, including Parliamentary Secretary for Not for Profit-Public Partnerships, Minister of State for Mining, Minister of State for ActNowBC. During their time in Opposition, Hogg, Campbell, and Geoff Plante shared an apartment in Victoria.

Hogg announced in October 2016 that he would not seek re-election in 2017.  The BC Liberals chose Tracy Redies, former CEO of Coast Capital Savings, as the next candidate for the riding.

Under Premier Christy Clark, Hogg would serve as Government Caucus Chair, as well as Parliamentary Secretary for Youth Sport.

Federal 

Hogg first ran for federal office under the Liberal banner in the riding of Surrey—White Rock—South Langley in 1993, placing second behind Reform candidate Val Meredith.

In 2017, Hogg was selected as the federal Liberal candidate in a by-election in South Surrey—White Rock created by the resignation of incumbent Conservative MP Dianne Watts.

Hogg defeated former Cabinet Minister, and former MP from neighbouring Delta—Richmond East, Kerry-Lynne Findlay, in the by-election, the first time a Liberal had won the riding since the 1940s, when the riding included all of Surrey, and most of New Westminster.

On March 21, 2018, Hogg was elected as Chair of the Federal Liberal Pacific Caucus. He sat on the House of Commons Standing Committees on Human Resources, Skills and Social Development and the Status of Persons with Disabilities and Canadian Heritage.

In October 21, 2019, Hogg lost re-election to Kerry-Lynne Findlay. He ran again in the 2021 federal election losing to Findlay.

Community work 

Hogg was a youth probation officer, and the Director of the Youth Custody Centre in Burnaby, BC. He has been a board member of more than 15 committees and non-profit societies, including the Peace Arch Community Health Council and Peace Arch Hospital.

In 1996, while working as the Director of the Burnaby Youth Detention Centre, he established Night Hoops, a program for at-risk youth to help reduce recidivism, and other related issues.

Hogg was named an Adjunct Professor in Criminology at Simon Fraser University in 2017.

Electoral record

Federal

Provincial

|-

|-

 
|NDP
|Matt Todd
|align="right"|3,415
|align="right"|12.56
|align="right"|-13.87
|align="right"|$5,509

|}

References

External links
 Gordon Hogg – MLA biography
 

Living people
British Columbia Liberal Party MLAs
Members of the Executive Council of British Columbia
Liberal Party of Canada MPs
Members of the House of Commons of Canada from British Columbia
People from White Rock, British Columbia
Politicians from Victoria, British Columbia
University of British Columbia alumni
21st-century Canadian politicians
1946 births
Mayors of places in British Columbia